Hubert Bichler (born September 2, 1959 in Holzkirchen, Upper Bavaria) is a German sport shooter. He competed at the 1992 Summer Olympics in the men's 50 metre rifle three positions event, in which he tied for 17th place, and the men's 50 metre rifle prone event, in which he placed fourth.

References

1959 births
Living people
ISSF rifle shooters
German male sport shooters
Shooters at the 1992 Summer Olympics
Olympic shooters of Germany